Weather Station Kurt (Wetter-Funkgerät Land-26) was an automatic weather station, erected by a German U-boat crew in northern Labrador, Dominion of Newfoundland, in October 1943. Installing the equipment for the station was the only known armed German military operation on land in North America during the Second World War. After the war it was forgotten until its rediscovery in 1977.

Background 
In the northern hemisphere, weather systems in temperate climates predominantly move from west to east. This gave the Allies an important advantage. The Allied network of weather stations in North America, Greenland, and Iceland allowed the Allies to make more accurate weather forecasts than the Germans.

German meteorologists used weather reports sent by U-boats and weather ships, such as Lauenburg, operating in the North Atlantic. They also had reports from clandestine weather stations in remote parts of the Arctic and readings collected over the Atlantic by specially equipped weather aircraft.

However, the ships and clandestine stations were easily captured by the Allies during the early part of the war. Data from aircraft was incomplete as they were limited in range and susceptible to Allied attack. Regular weather reporting by U-boats put them at risk as it broke radio silence, allowing the Allies to locate them and track their movements by radio triangulation.

Development and deployment 

To gather more weather information, the Germans developed the Wetter-Funkgerät Land (WFL) automatic weather station. It was designed by Dr. Ernst Ploetze and Edwin Stoebe. Twenty-six were manufactured by Siemens. The WFL had an array of measuring instruments, a telemetry system and a 150 watt, Lorenz 150 FK-type transmitter. One canister contained the instruments and was attached to a  antenna mast. A second, shorter mast carried an anemometer and wind vane. The other canisters contained the nickel-cadmium batteries that powered the system. The WFL would send weather readings every three hours during a two-minute transmission on 3940 kHz. The system could work for up to six months, depending on the number of battery canisters.
Fourteen stations were deployed in Arctic and sub-Arctic regions (Greenland, Bear Island, Spitsbergen, and Franz Josef Land) and five were placed around the Barents Sea. Two were intended for North America.

On September 18, 1943, U-537, commanded by Kapitänleutnant Peter Schrewe, departed from Kiel, Germany on her first combat patrol. She carried WFL-26, codenamed "Kurt", a meteorologist, Dr. Kurt Sommermeyer, and his assistant, Walter Hildebrant. En route, the U-boat was caught in a storm and a large breaker produced significant damage, including leaks in the hull and the loss of the submarine's quadruple anti-aircraft cannon, leaving it both unable to dive and defenceless against Allied aircraft.

On 22 October U-537 arrived at Martin Bay in Northern Labrador, at a position 60° 5′ 0.2" N 64° 22′ 50.8" W. This is close to Cape Chidley at the north-eastern tip of the Labrador Peninsula. Schrewe selected a site this far north as he believed this would minimize the risk of the station being discovered by Inuit. Within an hour of dropping anchor, a scouting party had located a suitable site, and soon after Dr. Sommermeyer, his assistant, and ten sailors disembarked to install the station. Armed lookouts were posted on nearby high ground, and other crew members set to repair the submarine's storm damage.
For concealment, the station was camouflaged. Empty American cigarette packets were left around the site to deceive any Allied personnel that chanced upon it. One canister was marked and misspelled "Canadian Meteor Service", in order to simulate “Canadian Weather Service”, as a German attempt to avoid suspicion if discovered. No such agency existed in Canada. In addition, the area was part of the Dominion of Newfoundland and was not part of Canada until 1949. The crew worked through the night to install Kurt and repair their U-boat. They finished just 28 hours after dropping anchor and, after confirming the station was working, U-537 departed. The weather station functioned for only a month before it permanently failed under mysterious circumstances, possibly because its radio transmissions were jammed. The U-boat undertook a combat patrol in the area of the Grand Banks of Newfoundland, during which she survived three attacks by Canadian aircraft, but sank no ships. The submarine reached port at Lorient, France on December 8, after seventy days at sea. She was sunk with all hands eleven months later on November 11, 1944, by the submarine USS Flounder near the Dutch East Indies.

Rediscovery 
The station was forgotten until 1977 when Peter Johnson, a geomorphologist working on an unrelated project, stumbled upon the German weather station. He suspected it was a Canadian military installation, and named it "Martin Bay 7". Around the same time, retired Siemens engineer Franz Selinger, who was writing a history of the company, went through Sommermeyer's papers and learned of the station's existence.

He contacted Canadian Department of National Defence historian W.A.B. Douglas, who went to the site with a team in 1981 and found the station still there, although the canisters had been opened and components strewn about the site. Weather Station Kurt was removed from its site and is now part of the collection of the Canadian War Museum in Ottawa.

See also 
 North Atlantic weather war
 Schatzgräber (weather station) in the former Soviet Union

References

External links 

 The Nazi weather station in Labrador
 Canadian War Museum artifact description
 German Description of Weather Station Kurt, including a wartime picture of the deployed station
 English Description of Weather Station Kurt

1943 meteorology
Meteorological stations
Siemens products
Buildings and structures in Newfoundland and Labrador
Military installations in Newfoundland and Labrador
Military sensor technology
Naval meteorology
World War II sites in Canada
Science and technology during World War II
World War II sites of Nazi Germany
Collections of museums in Canada
Military history of Canada during World War II